Francisco de Asís Lobatón Sánchez de Medina (b. Jerez de la Frontera, Cádiz, 6 December 1951), better known as Paco Lobatón, is a Spanish journalist.

Between March 2015 and 2016 he run the section Ventana QSD in the Televisión Española program Las mañanas de La 1 alongside Mariló Montero. He promoted the Fundación Europea por las Personas Desaparecidas. In 2015 he won the "Special" Ciudad de Jerez Award.

References

External links
 

1951 births
Spanish television presenters
20th-century Spanish journalists
21st-century Spanish journalists
Spanish radio producers
People from Jerez de la Frontera
Spanish radio personalities
Spanish television directors
Spanish television journalists
Living people